A list of alumni of St John's College, Oxford, former students of the college of the University of Oxford. The overwhelming maleness of this list is partially explained by the fact that for over 90% of its history (from its foundation in 1555 until 1979), women were barred from studying at St John's. The college maintains a growing list of profiles of prominent recent alumni on its website.

Politicians in the United Kingdom

 George Cave, 1st Viscount Cave
 Charles Cripps, 1st Baron Parmoor
 Henry Croke
 Edward du Cann
 William Duckett, MP
 Gwynfor Evans, former President of Plaid Cymru and first MP
 John Gilbert, Baron Gilbert
 Robert Henley, 1st Earl of Northington
 Auberon Herbert, MP and political philosopher. 
 Richard Holme, Baron Holme of Cheltenham
 Leslie Hore-Belisha, 1st Baron Hore-Belisha
 Peter Mews of Hinton Admiral
 Rhodri Morgan, former First Minister of Wales
 John Parker, MP
 Thomas Russell
 John Smith, 17th-century Chancellor of the Exchequer
 Shaun Spiers
 Michael Stewart, Baron Stewart of Fulham
 William Trumbull
 Henry Wallop
 Francis Windebank
 Sir Richard Wrottesley, 7th Baronet

Politicians and royalty of other countries

Civil servants and diplomats
 Alan Bailey, formerly Permanent Secretary, Department of Transport
 Mervyn Brown, Ambassador of the United Kingdom to Madagascar (1967–70), High Commissioner of the United Kingdom to Tanzania (1975–78), High Commissioner of the United Kingdom to Nigeria (1979–83)
 Ash Carter, United States Secretary of Defense
 Charles Crawford, Ambassador of the United Kingdom to Bosnia and Herzegovina (1996–98), Ambassador of the United Kingdom to Yugoslavia (2001–03), Ambassador of the United Kingdom to Poland (2003–07)
 David Faulkner, civil servant
 David Frost, Ambassador of the United Kingdom to Denmark (2006–08), CEO of the Scotch Whisky Association (2014–)
 Arnold Heeney
 Geoffrey Holland, former Permanent Secretary, Department of Employment and Department of Education and Vice-Chancellor, Exeter University; Chairman, Quality Improvement Agency
 Khoo Boon Hui, president of INTERPOL
Matthew Kirk, Ambassador of the United Kingdom to Finland (2002–06), Group External Affairs Director at Vodafone (2006–)
 Michael McFaul, United States Ambassador to Russia (2012-2014)
 Frank Newsam
 Michael Partridge, former Permanent Secretary, Department of Social Security; Pro-Chancellor and Governor, Middlesex University
 Maharaj Muthoo Doctorate from Oxford as Commonwealth scholar; Indian Government & United Nations System senior civil servant
 John Rickard
 R. James Woolsey, Jr., United States Under Secretary of the Navy (1977–79), 16th Director of the Central Intelligence Agency (1993–95)
 Chris Wormald, Permanent Secretary, Department of Health
 Heath Tarbert, Nominee for Assistant Secretary of the Treasury for International Markets and Development in the U.S. (2017)

Judges and lawyers
Nigel Carrington, lawyer and Vice-Chancellor of University of the Arts London
Brian Cregan, Irish High Court judge
James Eyre, judge
Nicholas Hamblen, Justice of the Supreme Court of the United Kingdom
Gérard La Forest, former Puisne Justice of the Supreme Court of Canada
Keith Lindblom
John Nicholl
Stephen Richards, Lord Justice
John Silvester, Recorder of London
Mark Warby, judge
James Whitelocke

Clergy

Saints, blessed and archbishops of Canterbury

Other bishops
 Alfred Averill, Archbishop of New Zealand
 Paul Barber
 John Buckeridge
 Robert Hay, Bishop of Buckingham
 Kenneth Kirk
 Peter Mews
 Hugh Montefiore
 Edwin Morris, Archbishop of Wales
 Peter Selby
 David Wilcox
 Kenneth Woollcombe

Other priests
 Frederick Copleston
 Edward Drax Free
 Vicesimus Knox
 Peter Thomson
 George Austen
 James Austen
 Henry Thomas Austen

Journalists and writers
Mark Abley, poet and journalist
Kingsley Amis, novelist
Daniel Blythe, author
Ivor Bulmer-Thomas
David Chater, award-winning British television foreign correspondent
Tom Chatfield, author
Victoria Coren Mitchell
Edmund Crispin
Evan Davis, journalist
Janine Gibson, journalist 
Robert Graves, poet
John Lawrence Hammond, journalist and editor
A. E. Housman, classical scholar, and poet
Simon Jack, BBC Business Editor, Presenter of Today Programme
Simon Jenkins, journalist and editor
John Lanchester
Philip Larkin, poet and librarian
Bronwen Maddox
Vic Marks, journalist and cricketer
Timothy Mo, novelist
Musa Okwonga, writer
Peter Preston, journalist and editor
Alan Ross
Hugh Schofield, BBC Paris correspondent
James Shirley
J. K. Stanford
D. J. Taylor
James Townley
Jason Webster
Norman Webster, journalist and editor
John Wain
Henry Willobie, poet
Jonathan Wright, journalist and translator

Sports
Sue Day, England rugby captain
John Davis, Welsh cricketer
William Evans, Welsh international footballer
Mike Fitzpatrick, footballer
Chris Penny, American rower, 1988 Blue Boat, Olympic silver medallist
Barbara Slater, sports producer and gymnast
Chris Tavare, England international cricketer
John Young, cricketer

Others
Robert G. W. Anderson, museum curator
Cyril Beeson, entomologist and forest conservator
Trevor Bench-Capon, computer scientist
Sarah-Jayne Blakemore, scientist
Paula Booth - Daniell Chair of Chemistry at King's College London
Ian Bostridge, tenor
Christopher Brewin
Hector Catling, archaeologist
Winston Churchill
Jared Cohen, Director of Google Ideas think-tank
John Cottingham
Reginald de Koven
Andrew Dilnot
Henry Ellis, librarian
Reginald John Farrer
Antony Flew, philosopher
Robert Fludd
Paul Grice, philosopher (fellow 1939–1967, not an alumnus)
Ronald Gurner
Tyrone Guthrie, theatre director and producer
Peter Hacker, philosopher (fellow 1966–2006, not an alumnus)
Ralph Hartley
Paul M. Hayes  (1942–1995), historian
Eric Heaton
Gilbert Highet
Alastair Humphreys, adventurer
Roger Howell, Jr.
Frank Kearton, Baron Kearton
Patrick Kennedy (actor)
Riad al Khouri, Economist; former Dean of the Business School, Lebanese French University, Iraq; currently principal, Discover Studies, Jordan, and member of the board of directors, Global Challenges Forum, Switzerland 
Jason Kingsley, Rebellion Developments co-founder
Belinda Kirk, explorer
Alexander Leeper, Australian educationist
Henry Longueville Mansel
Mohammed Mamdani, social entrepreneur
Sir John Marsham, 1st Baronet
Edward Maufe, architect and designer
Gilbert Murray, classical scholar
Yannis Philippakis, lead singer of British indie rock band Foals (band)
Alfred W. Pollard
Quilla Constance, aka Jennifer Allen, fine artist
William Mitchell Ramsay
Sanjeev Sanyal, writer and economist
Peter Frederick Strawson, philosopher
Jethro Tull, agriculturist
Sundeep Waslekar, Founder and President of Strategic Foresight Group think-tank
Stephen Wolfram
Bernard Taylor (Banker)

Fictional
Inspector Morse, fictional TV crime series character, suggested to have won a scholarship

References

Alumni
St John's